Mary-Anne Monckton (born 16 November 1994) is an Australian artistic gymnast. She won two silver medals at the 2014 Commonwealth Games and has represented Australia at three world championships (2011, 2014, 2015). In 2020, she was the first of several former gymnasts to speak out about a "toxic" culture within the country's elite programme.

Personal life
Monckton first took up gymnastics because her cousin Melissa did it. At first, she didn't like the sport, but her cousin was persistent in taking her because she had too much energy.

She has said she admires Catalina Ponor because of her "amazing work ethic". Her best apparatus is the balance beam, and her favourite skill on the beam is the aerial cartwheel. She said being selected for the 2014 Commonwealth Games was her best moment in her gymnastics career so far.

Senior career

2014
At the 2014 Commonwealth Games, Monckton helped the Australian team finish in second place, scoring 14.000 on vault, 13.333 on the uneven bars and 13.100 on the balance beam. Monckton also qualified for the balance beam final, where she scored 13.666 and earned a second silver medal.

Eponymous skill
Monckton has one eponymous skill listed in the Code of Points.

References

Living people
1994 births
Australian female artistic gymnasts
Commonwealth Games silver medallists for Australia
Commonwealth Games medallists in gymnastics
Gymnasts at the 2014 Commonwealth Games
Originators of elements in artistic gymnastics
21st-century Australian women
Medallists at the 2014 Commonwealth Games